Janet Healy is a film producer whose films include Illumination's Despicable Me animated series and other animated films by the studio.

Career
She worked with directors Stanley Kramer, Hal Ashby and Sam Peckinpah. Healy is a founder of the Visual Effects Society. She then joined George Lucas's Industrial Light & Magic.

In 1995, she joined Walt Disney Animation Studios.

Healy is one of the producers of the Despicable Me franchise as well as other Illumination films including Sing (2016) and The Secret Life of Pets (2016). Beside that, she also produced Shark Tale (2004) for DreamWorks Animation.

Filmography

Films

References

External links
 

20th-century births
Living people
20th-century American businesspeople
21st-century American businesspeople
20th-century American businesswomen
21st-century American businesswomen
Illumination (company) people
Year of birth missing (living people)
Place of birth missing (living people)
DreamWorks Animation people
American film producers
American women film producers